Trechus mourzinellus is a species of ground beetle in the subfamily Trechinae. It was described by Deuve in 1998.

References

mourzinellus
Beetles described in 1998